Mohammed bin al-Tayyib or Abu Abdallah Mohammed bin Mohammed bin Musa bin Mohammed al-Sharqi al-Sumayli ibn Tayyib al-Fasi al-Alami (1698–1756) was a famous Moroccan linguist, historian and scholar of fikh (law) and hadith. He is the author of sixteen books on grammar and morphology, nine books on lexicography, many books on quranic interpretation and exegesis, hadith, sufism, fiqh and  biographies of famous poets and scholars of Al-Andalus. He also wrote The Companion of the Performer (al-Anis al-Mutrib). One of his many teachers was the music theorist Bu 'Isami (d. ca. 1103 AH/1690 AD). Ibn al-Tayyib is the author of a well known rihla, Rihla ila al-Hijaz.

Works

Quranic Interpretation or Exegesis
Hawashi al-Jalalayn
Hawashi al-Baydawi
Hawashf al- Kashshaf

Hadith
Hawashi al-Qastalani
Uyun al-Mawarid al-Salsalah min Uyun al-Asanid al-Musalsalah 
Tamhid al-Dalail wa talkhis al-Awail

Biography (in the field of religious studies)
Samt al-Faraid
Risalah fi mana'al as-Salat ala al-Rasul
al-lstisha bima fi dhat al-Shifa fi Sirah al-Nabi- thumma al Khulafa
Sharh sirah Ibn Faris
Hawashi al-Shamail

Sufism
Sharh al-Hizb al-Nawawi

Fiqh
Fatawa 
al-Istimsak Urwah fi al-Ahkam al-Mutaallaqah bi al-Qahwa
al-Taliqat al-Fiqhiyya
Hawashi al-Mahalli

Biographies (in the field of history)
Al-Anis Al-Mutrib Fiman laqaynahu min Udaba al-Maghrib
Al-Ufuq al-Mushriq bi Tarajum Man Laqaynahu bi al-Mashriq
Irsal al-Asanid wa Isal al-Musannafat wa al-Ajzawa al-Masanid
Iqrar Al-Ayn bi Iqrar al-Athar bad Dhihab al-Ayn
Al-Azhar al-Nadiyyah fi al-Tarikh

Grammar and Morphology
Hashiya ala al-Muradi
Hashiya ala al-Mughni
Hashiya ala al-Tasrih
Sharh al-Ashbah wa al-Nazair
Hashiya al-Makudi
Faydal-Inshirah min Rawd Tayy al-Iqtirah
Sharh Lamiyah al-Afalli Ibn Malik
Hashiyah ala Sharhal-Ajrumiyah
Iqamat al-Burhan ala anna al-Afal al-Naqisah Innama Tadullu ala al-Zaman
Hawashi al-Tahsil
Hawashi al-Tawdih
Hawashi ala Sharh al-Qawa'id
Sharh Kafiyah
Hawashi Sharh Lamiyya al-Afal
Risalah fi Halumma Jarra
Sharh al-Kafiyah

Lexicography
Al-Musfir an Khabaya al-Muzhir
Idaait al-Ramus wa Idafat al-Namus ala lda'at al-Qamus
Hashiyah ala Durarat al-Ghawwas fi Awham al-Khawwas
Mawti'at al-Fasih li Muwata'at al-Fasih
Tahrir al-Riwayah fi taqrir al-Kifayah
Daws al-Qabus fi Zawaid al-Sihah ala al-Qamus
Hawashi al-Rawd al-Masluf
Hawashi Shifa al-Ghalil
Tadhkarah

Literature and literary Studies
Isfar al-Litham an Mahya Shawahid Ibn Hisham
Hawashi ala Sharh Uqud al-Juman
Qasidah Raiyyah fi madh al-Rasul alayhi al-salam
Diwan Shi'r
Takhlis al-Takhlis min Shawahid Al-Talkhis
Anwa' al-Anwar fi Sharh Shawahid al-Kashshaf wa al-Anwar
Shari al-Qasida al-Madariya
Sharh Dawawin al-Shuara al-Sittah
Sharh Shawahid al-Ri'di
Sharh al-Muallaqat
Maalayhi al-Maul min Mabahith al-Sayyid al-Matuf
Hawashi al-Mukhtasar
al-Mafrud fi ilm al-Qawafi wa al-Urud
Hawashi Sharh Zakariya li al-Khazrajiyyah
al-Rihla al-Hijaziyya
al-Rihla al-Badia
al-Rihla al-Mashriqiyyah

References

Linguists from Morocco
Moroccan lexicographers
Moroccan Maliki scholars
Moroccan Sufi writers
Moroccan biographers
Moroccan travel writers
Music theorists
1698 births
1756 deaths
17th-century Moroccan people
18th-century Moroccan people
Moroccan musicians
17th-century Arabs
18th-century Arabs
Moroccan people of Arab descent
People from Fez, Morocco
18th-century lexicographers